Canada is a democratic country in North America. The New Democratic Party has existed since 1961. Below is a list of the candidates of the New Democratic Party in the different Provinces and territories of Canada during the 2015 Canadian federal election.

Candidate statistics

Newfoundland and Labrador – 7 seats

Prince Edward Island – 4 seats

Nova Scotia – 11 seats

New Brunswick – 10 seats

Quebec – 78 seats

Ontario – 121 seats

Manitoba – 14 seats

Saskatchewan – 14 seats

Alberta – 34 seats

British Columbia – 42 seats

Yukon – 1 seat

Northwest Territories – 1 seat

Nunavut – 1 seat

See also
Results of the Canadian federal election, 2015
Results by riding for the Canadian federal election, 2015

References

External links
 NDP website

Candidates in the 2015 Canadian federal election